The 1997–98 WHL season was the 32nd season for the Western Hockey League (WHL).  Eighteen teams completed a 72-game season.  The Portland Winter Hawks won the President's Cup before going on to win the 1998 Memorial Cup.

Regular season

Final standings

Scoring leaders
Note: GP = Games played; G = Goals; A = Assists; Pts = Points; PIM = Penalties in minutes

Goaltending leaders
Note: GP = Games played; Min = Minutes played; W = Wins; L = Losses; T = Ties ; GA = Goals against; SO = Total shutouts; SV% = Save percentage; GAA = Goals against average

1998 WHL Playoffs
Top eight teams in the Eastern Conference (East and Central divisions) qualified for playoffs
Top six teams in the Western Conference (division) qualified for the playoffs

Conference quarterfinals

Eastern Conference

Western Conference

Conference semifinals

Conference finals

WHL Championship

All-Star Game

On January 21, the Western Conference defeated the Eastern Conference 7–6 at Regina, Saskatchewan before a crowd of 6,050.

WHL awards

All-Star Teams

See also
1998 Memorial Cup
1998 NHL Entry Draft
1997 in sports
1998 in sports

References
whl.ca
2005–06 WHL Guide

Western Hockey League seasons
WHL
WHL